John Cecil, 6th Earl of Exeter (15 May 1674 – 24 December 1721), known as Lord Burghley from 1678 to 1700, was a British peer and Member of Parliament.

He was the son of John Cecil, 5th Earl of Exeter, and Anne Cavendish.  He sat as Member of Parliament for Rutland from 1695 to 1700, when he succeeded his father in the earldom and entered the House of Lords.  Between 1712 and 1715 he also served as Lord Lieutenant of Rutland.

Exeter married, firstly, Annabella Grey, daughter of Ford Grey, 1st Earl of Tankerville, in 1697.  After her death in 1698 he married, secondly, Elizabeth Brownlow, daughter of Sir John Brownlow, 3rd Baronet, in 1699.  He died on Christmas Eve in December 1721, and was succeeded in his titles by his eldest son from his second marriage, John. Lady Exeter died in 1723.

The 6th Earl's second son from his second marriage, Brownlow Cecil, 8th Earl of Exeter, would eventually succeed his brother to the title.

The 6th Earl also had a third son, named William, who was educated with his brother Brownlow 'at St. John's College, Cambridge, and gave great hopes that he would maintain the lustre of the family; "but died too early, to the concern of all who had the happiness of his acquaintance, July 19, 1717."'

He also had a fourth and a fifth son, Francis and Charles. 'The Hon. Charles Cecil, fifth son of John, sixth earl of Exeter, died young and unmarried, in 1726'.

He also had a daughter, Lady Elizabeth Aislabie. She was the only daughter of the Earl, and wife of William Aislabie, Esq. of Studley, in Yorkshire, son and heir of John Aislabie, Chancellor of the Exchequor. She died in 1733, aged 26 years, and was buried at Ripon.

References

Bibliography 
 Kidd, Charles, Williamson, David (editors). Debrett's Peerage and Baronetage (1990 edition). New York: St Martin's Press, 1990.

External links 
 www.thepeerage.com

1674 births
1721 deaths
17th-century English nobility
18th-century English nobility
Barons Burghley
John Cecil, 6th Earl of Exeter
Earls of Exeter
Lord-Lieutenants of Rutland
Burghley, John Cecil, Lord
English MPs 1698–1700